Avalon station may refer to:

Avalon station (Los Angeles Metro)
Avalon North Station
Avalon (RTA Rapid Transit station)